Torbrex is a small former weaving village in the Stirling Council Area, Scotland. Torbrex lies a mile (1.5 km) to the southwest of Stirling, between Cambusbarron and St Ninians.  Consisting mainly of 19th-century cottages, it has among its older buildings Torbrex House (1721) and Williamsfield House (1682), which was built in 1682 by William Wordie of Torbrex.

The old High School of Stirling was located here and an extension, adjoining the Sports Ground and known as the New High School, was built in 1962. Stirling High School is located on the St. Ninians/Livlilands side of Torbrex.

Geographically Torbrex is enclosed within Stirling by Cambusbarron to the west, St. Ninians to the south, Livlilands to the east and Kenningknowes & Laurelhill to the north.

The oldest bones of a human from the Stirling area were found in Torbrex in 2017. Archaeologists named the bones "Torbrex Tam". It is believed he died around 2152 to 2021 BC. The bones are more than 4000 years old.

Stirling Cricket Club was based at Williamfield in Torbrex for 130 years, from 1877 until 2007.

Torbrex has an Inn which dates back to 1726.

References

Geography of Stirling (council area)